This is a list of holy figures in Yazidism.

There are a total of 365 Yazidi holy figures venerated by Yazidis. Many Yazidi tribes and lineages are named after Yazidi holy figures and there are many temples and shrines built in their honor. Holy figures in Yazidism are designated by various special terms including Babçak, Xudan (lord, master, owner, holder, proprietor, protector, deity), Xas (selected, notable, special, elite) and Mêr which translates to (holy) man. According to Yazidi belief God is almighty and absolute, and the Xudans are a part of His power, moreover, in relation to nature, Yazidis believe in Xudans for most of natural elements and phenomena and they are regarded as divine powers that have control over these phenomena. In Yazidi mythology, the Xudans appeared after the creation of the world for the four elements of nature and their manifestations.

Sheikhs

Below is a list of Yazidi holy figures belonging or associated with Sheikh caste:

Adanî 
Şêx Adî
Şêx Hesen (Şêxisin), Xudanê Qelemê (Master of the Pen), patriarch of the Adanî Sheikhs, member of the Heptad
Şêx Brahîmê Xetimî
Şêxê Êtîma
Şêx Mûsê Sor, Xudan of the air and wind
Şêx Şerfedîn
Şêx Zêndîn, associated with the totem animal hares and is considered their protector
Sitiya Gul

Qatanî 

Şêxûbekir, patriarch of the Qatanî Sheikhs, member of the Heptad
Şêx ʿEbdilqadir
 Şêx Îsmaîlê ʿEnzelî
 Şêx Kara
 Şêx Maviyê Zar
 Şêx Mehmedê Batinî
 Şêx Sorê Sora
 Şêx Xelîfeta

Şemsanî 
Êzdînê Mîr, patriarch and ancestor of the Şemsanî Sheikhs
Şêx Şems (Şêşims), member of the Heptad, Xudan of fire, light and sun
Amadîn (‘Emad ad-Dīn), son of Sheikh Shems; possesses curative powers over stomach aches
Şêx Bavikê Şemsa (Sheikh Babik), son of Sheikh Shems
Şêx Alê Şemsa, son of Sheikh Shems
Şêx Avîndê Şemsa, son of Sheikh Shems
Şêx Babadînê Şemsa, son of Sheikh Shems
Şêx Evdalê Şemsa, son of Sheikh Shems
Şêx Hesenê Şemsa, son of Sheikh Shems, Xatûna Fexra's husband
Şêxê Reş (Cinteyar)
Şêx Tokilê Şemsa, son of Sheikh Shems
Şêx Xidirê Şemsa, son of Sheikh Shems
Sitiya Îs/Ês, daughter of Sheikh Shems
Sitiya Nisret, daughter of Sheikh Shems
Sitiya Bilxan (Belqan), daughter of Sheikh Shems
Fexredîn, member of the Heptad, Xudan of the Moon
Şêx Mend, eldest son of Fakhraddin; Lord of Snakes and Serpents
Xatûna Fexra, female saint, daughter of Fakhraddin, wife of Şêx Hesenê Şemsa; Guardian of Birth and Pregnancy
Şêx Bedir, son of Fakhraddin
Aqûb, adopted son of Fakhraddin
Nasirdîn, member of the Heptad, Angel of Death and Renewal, separates the soul from the body during a person's death, portrayed as an executioner and holder of a knife
Sicadîn, member of the Heptad, psychopomp and messenger of death, associated with the totem animal mices and is considered their protector

Other Sheikh figures 

 Sheikh 'Ebrûs/Hevruz (Xudan of thunder and lightning)
 Şêx Mişeleh (Xefûrê Rêya) protector of roads & patron of travellers, has shrines at Lalish and Ain Sifni.
 Sheikh Bako. Has a shrine at Bahzani. The shrine is accompanied by a spring with a fig tree, which is visited by pilgrims with fevers. Pilgrims fasten small bits of their clothes on the tree and feed the fish in the spring.
 Sheikh Kiras ("Lord Shirt"), Lord of revelations about spirits. Yazidis also speak of death and reincarnation as "changing one's shirt."
 Şahsiwar/Sheikh Suwar ("Lord of Horsemen"; Xudan of war and horsemanship). Has a shrine in Beban village.
 Sheikh Muhemmed. He had a wife named Sitt Hebîbe. Fought against "the great Sheikh" at Bashiqa. Buried near the monastery of Mar Gûrgîs in the Mosul area. His servant was buried at Bashiqa.
 Sheikh Hentûsh, one of Sheikh Adi's first disciples
 Ebû ’l-Qasim, one of Sheikh Adi's early disciples. He was a son of Sheikh Hentûsh.
Sheikh Shelal. Possibly identified with Rumi.
Sitt Hebîbe, Marta Hebîbta ("the Beloved Lady"), the wife of Sheikh Muhemmed. Has shrines near Bahzani and in Bashiqa.
Sheikh ‘Eqîl Munejjî, one of Sheikh Adi's first disciples. Associated wirth Me'rûf el-Kerkhî. His name might have been derived from ‘Uqayl al-Mambijî.
el-Khasiyye, Khasse, a female saint whose name sounds like the Arabic word for lettuce (khass).

Pîrs 

Below is a list of Yazidi holy figures belonging or associated with the Pir caste:

 Tawûsî Melek, Lord of this World and Leader of the seven Divine Beings. Only one angel is considered to be a Pîr by Yazidis; he is Tawûsî Melek and he is considered to be the "bavê Pîran" (Father of Pîrs) and the greatest Pîr, which is why he is considered to be a Pîr of all the Pîrs from Pîr Hesen Meman lineage, who in turn are considered Pîrs of the forty homes of Pîrs. Tawûsî Melek's name is seldom mentioned openly and he is instead called Pîr Melekê Elladî ('The Pîr Angel of the Best Religion'), Pîrê Batinî ('Concealed Pîr') and Pîrê Perdê (Pîr of the Veil) in religious texts.

Pîr Hesen Meman, was one of the close associates of Sheikh Adi, Pir of the forty Pirs and the head of Pirs. According to the Yazidi tradition, he was the ruler of Harir near Erbil.
Hesen Elka
Pîr Xetîb Pisî
Pîr Afat, Xudan of floods, storms and natural disasters, invoked to protect human life and agricultural production from natural disasters, storms, floods or cold during winter 
Mehmed Reshan (Mem Reshan), "the lion" and Lord of the Rains.
Pîr Derbês
Pîr Jerwan, Xudan of Scorpions. Subdivisions:
Pîr Îsêbiya ("Pîr Îsa ibn Abî"), one of the followers of Sheikh Adi and his Xezîndar (treasurer).
Hajjî Muhemmed
Pîr Omer Khalid, ‘Omer Khale, patriarch of the Mirebbî.
Pîr Qeḍîb el-Ban, a companion of Sheikh Adi
Pîr Khanî. Traditionally had close ties with the Xaltî tribe in the Diyarbakir area of southern Turkey, with clan members now living in Ain Sifni in northern Iraq.
Pir Ali (?)
Pîr Sinî Daranî/Bahrî (Lord of the sea and son of a sea maiden)
Pîr Hajjo ‘Elî, Hajial, Hajalî
Pîr Bûb
Bûbê Qelender. Likely identified with Pîr Bub.
Pîr Fadil
Pîr Sedîq
Pîr Mend (?)
Pîr Buwal (?)
Gavanê Zerzan (protector of cattle)
Mem Şivan ("the Shepherd"), protector of sheep, he is represented in the bas-reliefs here with his crook and sheep.
Pîrê Libnan, Xudan of weddings and family life, during the feast of Xidir Liyas and Xidir Nebî, Yezidis perform rites to ask Xidir Nebî as well as Pîrê Libnan about their wedding and happiness, according to oral tradition, Libnan constructed many places of pilgrimage, acquiring him the epithet of "the Pîr of building-blocks"
Pîrê Ewra, Xudan of the Clouds, Yazidis venerate the clouds as the source of rain and snow in winter. Some Yazidis fast for one day in his honour.
Pîr Dawud, a loyal servant of Sheikh Adi
Pîr Sheref, a descendant of Dawûd
Pîrê Terjiman, Sheikh Adi's Arabic to Kurdish translator (since Sheikh Adi was born in Lebanon)
Pîr Mehmedê Reben, has a shrine at Lalish, the current holder of the Baba Chawish position comes from his lineage
Pîr Alû Bekr, possesses curative powers over mouth diseases. Has a shrine at Lalish.

Other holy figures 
Below are other holy figures, many of whom are considered to be Xudans of specific objects and functions.

Ebû Rîsh, has a shrine at Bahzani
Derwêşê Erdê ("Dervish of the Earth"), Xudan of the Earth, invoked during sowing season and at burials, protector of property (In the past, when Yazidis left something valuable on the ground for a few hours, he was invoked to protect it)
Baba Gûshgûsh, possesses curative powers over ear diseases
Sitt Nefîse ("Lady Precious") possesses curative powers over fever and insomnia. Personification of a sacred fig or olive tree near Bashiqa.
Feqire 'Eli
Kanî Zerr/Kaniya Zerka, possesses curative powers over jaundice, personification of a spring. His name literally means "yellow spring."
Melekê Mîran (Mêran), possesses curative powers over rheumatism
Evdê Reş/'Ebd Resh ('Ebdî Resho), protector of springs, a companion of Musa Sor. Has shrines in the villages of Kerabeg and Kendale.
Bû Qetar Baba, representative of Sheikh Adi in the Mardin area, where a major shrine is dedicated to him
Hekîm Fêris/Hekkî Fîres/Hakim Luqman, a descendant of Luqman. Patron saint of wounds, since his descendants cure wounds with herbs and medicines.
Lakmadîn Baba, Sheikh Adi's secretary and guardian of his secrets.
Se‘d and Mes‘ûd (or Se‘îd and Mes‘ûd, Mes‘ûd and Musey‘id). Mes'ûd’s shrine is near Bahzani, while the shrines of Mes‘ûd and Musey‘id are in Bashiqa.
Dayka Jakan, Has a shrine near Bahzani.
Xidir Liyas/Nebî, Xudan of water, streams and seas, in some Qewl passages, described as a Zindî (Immortal) and his place is the sea or seashore, therefore, he is described as having an eternal life, during the feast of Xidir Nebî and Xidir Liyas in February, Yazidis who are in love perform rites to ask Xidir Nebî as well as Pîrê Libnan about their wedding and happiness

Christian and Islamic figures
In Yazidism, figures of Islamic or Christian origin include:

Shehîd ibn Jerr = Seth, the son of Adam and the progenitor of the Yazidis. His tomb and qubbe (conical spire) are at Bashiqa.
Ibrahîm Khelil = Ibrahim (Abraham)
Mûsa = Moses. Sometimes identified with Sheikh Fekhr el-Dîn.
Behlûl, Behlûlê Dîn, Behlûlê Dîwane ("Behlûl the Mad") = Bahlool. Said to be one of the first disciples of Sheikh Adi.
‘Ebd el-Qadir
Weys el-Qeneyrî = Owais al-Qarani. Has a shrine near Ba'shîqe.
Rabi‘e el-‘Edewiyye = Rabia of Basra
el-Hesen el-Beşrî = Hasan al-Basri. Identified with Sheikh Hesen.
Bayezîd of Bisṭam = Bayazid Bastami
Sheikh Menşûr el-Hellaj, Hisênê Hellaj =  Mansur al-Hallaj. Has a shrine at Lalish.
Sitt Khadîje el-Kubra = Khadija bint Khuwaylid. Has a shrine at Ba'shîqe.

See also
List of Yazidi holy places
List of Yazidi tribes
Yazidi social organization
Yazidi literature
Yazidism

Further reading

References

 
Yazidi mythology
Mythology-related lists
Yazidi holy figures